East Meets West (subtitled Musique of Ahmed Abdul-Malik) is the second album by American double bassist Ahmed Abdul-Malik featuring performances recorded in 1959 and originally released on the RCA Victor label the following year.

Reception

Ken Dryden of Allmusic says, "Not a release of interest to everyone but, for the most part, this fusion of vastly different styles of music is quite enjoyable; it's obvious from the start that the musicians were enjoying themselves as it was recorded".

Track listing
All compositions by Ahmed Abdul-Malik
 "E-Lail (The Night)" – 4:22
 "La Ilbky (Don't Cry)" – 4:59
 "Takseem (Solo)" – 5:14
 "Searchin'" – 4:06
 "Isma'a (Listen)" – 4:20
 "Rooh (The Soul)" – 3:46
 "Mahawara" – 4:18
 "El Ghada" – 3:07

Personnel
Ahmed Abdul-Malik – surbahar, oud
Lee Morgan – trumpet (tracks 1, 2 & 5)
Curtis Fuller – trombone (tracks 4 & 6–8)
Jerome Richardson – flute (tracks 4 & 6–8)
Benny Golson – tenor saxophone
Johnny Griffin – tenor saxophone (tracks 1, 2 & 5)
Naim Karacand – violin (tracks 1–3 & 5)
Ahmed Yetman – kanoon (tracks 1–3 & 5)
Al Harewood – drums (tracks 1, 2 & 4–8)
Bilal Abdurraham, Mike Hemway – darabeka (tracks 1, 2 & 5)
Jakarawan Nasseur – vocals (track 3)

References

RCA Records albums
Ahmed Abdul-Malik albums
1960 albums